Mercedes Stables LLC is an American Thoroughbred racing stable founded in 
November 2000.  Substantially all of the interest in Mercedes Stables is 
held by Ernest W. Moody, a Las Vegas gaming entrepreneur.  Mercedes Stables 
was majority partner in ownership of Rock Hard Ten (Madeleine A. Paulson, now Pickens, held a minority 
share).  Among the many good horses campaigned exclusively  by Mercedes
Stables have been G1 winner and millionaire Seattle Smooth, G2  winner Indian Ocean, track record holder and stakes winner Indian Way, and  homebred G3
winner Run It.

References
 Mercedes Stable at the NTRA

American racehorse owners and breeders